Islamic environmentalism is a strand of environmental philosophy as well as an Islamic movement that employs environmental principles derived from Islamic scriptures and traditions to the environment and the modern-day environmental crisis. Muslim environmentalists believe in God's absolute sovereignty over nature and emphasize humanity's role as God's vicegerent, making it their duty to protect and preserve the environment.  Islamic environmentalism encompasses Islamic ecological philosophy, Sharia-based environmental law, and Islamic environmental activism.

History
Islamic environmentalism began with the Iranian philosopher Seyyed Hossein Nasr and has evolved since the 1960s. A series of lectures delivered at the University of Chicago in 1966 by Nasr serves as an original point of reference.  He was, in fact, among the early thinkers "to draw attention to the spiritual dimensions of the environmental crisis". Nasr draws on Sufism and the concept of the unity of being to emphasize the connections between environmental degradation and the modern world's spiritual and moral crises. The field of Islamic environmentalism developed further in the 1980s with the contributions made by contemporary thinkers such as Mawil Izzi Dien and Fazlun Khalid.

People
The Iranian-born philosopher Seyyed Hossein Nasr is considered the founding father of Islamic environmentalism.  Other notable figures in this field include: Fazlun Khalid, Mawil Izzi Dien, Othman Llewellyn, Ibrahim Ozdemir, Syed Nomanul Haq and  Mustafa Abu Sway.

Ideas

No human sovereignty
The concept of human sovereignty over nature and natural resources, referred to as "dominion" in religious contexts, lies at the center of religious and secular environmental debates. The Quran, unlike the Hebrew Bible and secular philosophy, does not recognize human sovereignty over nature, which has a significant impact on Islamic environmental debate. The Quran declares in seventeen different places that mulk or dominion exclusively belongs to God (Allah). Mulk is derived from the root M L K and means "ownership" or "possession." It appears forty-eight times in the Quran, and it refers to both the earthly kingdom or kingship, such as the kingdom of Solomon in 2:102, and to "the heavens and the earth", implying the whole of creation. It is always God who possesses mulk in every passage when "the heavens and the earth" as a whole is mentioned, rather than a specific earthly kingdom.

Mankind as Khalifah
The Quran defined mankind as a Khālifah, or a representative or successor on the earth, rather than having dominion over or possession of it. The idea of khalifah (stewardship) is arguably the most important concept in Islamic environmentalism. Proponents of eco-Islamic beliefs emphasize man's duty as God's vicegerent or steward (khalifah) on the earth. As such, he is responsible for acting in line with God's will and caring for the earth in the way He demands. It is vital to recognize that stewardship does not imply supremacy over other living beings. Humans must learn to live in harmony with nature rather than working against it in order to practice stewardship. Some Muslim scholars even consider this stewardship a divine test. Natural world, as God's creation, is a sign through which humanity can perceive God.

Oneness of God
The idea of oneness of God (tawhid) is another important principle that is frequently pursued in Islamic ecology. Within the context of Islamic environmentalism, the notion of tawhid has different levels of meaning. To begin with, it denotes monotheistic oneness of God, in contrast to the  polytheistic doctrines and beliefs, and unity of God, in contrast to the Christian idea of the Trinity. It is an expression of God's transcendent unity with all of His creation. This unity with creation expresses the reality that everything in the world is a part of God's creation and is interconnected, making the entire world meaningful, valuable, and deserving of preservation.

Notion of mizan
The notion of mizan, which means "balance", is fundamental to an Islamic environmental perspective. This idea is employed to describe the complex eco-systems and physical laws of the cosmos. The most common verse used by Muslim scholars when discussing mizan is 15:19, which says, "As for the earth, We have spread it out, set firm mountains on it, and made everything grow there in due balance". In other words humans must "make the best use of reason and to maintain the balance and proportion God has built into his creation". In Arabic, the word mizan connotes both physical balance, and justice.

Other ideas
To address contemporary issues such as pollution, Muslim authors employ the Islamic juristic practice of Qiyas (reasoning by analogy). They understand ahadith regulating cleanliness, prohibitions against odour, and hygiene as prohibitions against contamination of land, water, and air.

Islamic environmental literature cites sayings of the Prophet emphasising the importance of conserving water during ablution and not being wasteful as instances of Islam's attitude on wasteful resource consumption.

See also

 Biocentrism (ethics)
 Deep ecology
 Environmental ethics
 Islamic Foundation for Ecology and Environmental Science
 Land ethic
 Resacralization of nature

References

Sources

Further reading

External links
 Environmental Ethics and Islam — Research Center for Islamic Legislation and Ethics
 How Islam can represent a model for environmental stewardship — UN Environment Programme
 The environment in Islamic civilization: The concept of human Khilafah on Earth by Dr. Ali Gomaa — Al-Masry Al-Youm 

Islam and environmentalism
Environmentalism and religion
Ecotheology
Environmental philosophy
Seyyed Hossein Nasr